Mary Coughlan may refer to:

Mary Coughlan (politician) (born 1965), former Irish Fianna Fáil politician
Mary Coughlan (singer) (born 1956), Irish singer